Ragile Jwala is a 1981 Telugu language action drama film directed by K. Raghavendra Rao and produced by T. Trivikrama Rao under Vijayalakshmi Art Pictures. The film stars Krishnam Raju, Jaya Prada and Sujatha. The music was composed by Chakravarthy.

Cast
Krishnam Raju as Krishna / Raja
Jaya Prada as Vani
Sujatha as Lakshmi
Kaikala Satyanarayana
Nagabhushanam as Bhushanam
Rao Gopal Rao as Dharma Raju
Jaggayya
Pushpalata
Jhansi
Allu Rama Lingaiah as Kanakaiah
Jaya Malini as Radha
Chalapathi Rao
Giri Babu
Suthi Veerabhadra Rao
Potti Prasad

Soundtrack

References

1981 films
1980s Telugu-language films
Indian action drama films
1980s action drama films
Films directed by K. Raghavendra Rao
Films scored by K. Chakravarthy